Devi Lal twice became Chief Minister of Haryana. Second time he was chief minister from 17 July 1987 to December 1989. Here is the list of ministers in his second cabinet:

Cabinet Ministers
Devi Lal, Chief Minister
Banarsi Das Gupta, Deputy Chief Minister 
Dr. Mangal Sein, Deputy Chief Minister 
Verender Singh, Irrigation & Power Minister
Dr. Kirpa Ram Punia, Industries Minister. 
Suraj Bhan, Revenue Minister
Sampat Singh, Home Minister
Hukam Singh, Development Minister
Ram Bilas Sharma, Public Health Minister
Kamla Verma, Health and Ayurveda Minister
Luxmi Narain, Industrial Training Minister
Om Parkash Bhardwaj, Public Works Minister
 Sushma Swaraj - Education Minister
Rao Ram Narain, Excise and Taxation Minister 
Parma Nand, Forests and Wild Life Preservation Minister 
Subhash Chand Katyal, Social Welfare Minister
 Ranjit Singh Chautala, Agriculture Minister
 Dr. Maha Singh, Tourism Minister
 Ved Singh Malik, Transport Minister

Ministers of State
Dr. Raghuvir Singh, Minister of State for Cooperation 
Dharambir, Minister of State for Transport
Balbir Singh, Minister of State for Labour and Employment
Azmat Khan, Minister of State for Animal Husbandry
Sita Ram Singla, Minister of State for Sports and Cultural Affairs 
Nar Singh, Minister of State for Food and Supplies
Hari Singh, Minister of State for Civil Aviation
Manphool Singh, Minister of State for Printing and Stationery
Hasan Mohammad, Minister of State for Wakf
Lachhman Singh, Minister of State for Housing
Sachdev, Minister of State for Dairy Development

See also
First Devi Lal ministry (1977–1979)

References

Lal 02
1987 in India
Janata Dal state ministries
1987 establishments in Haryana
1989 disestablishments in India
Cabinets established in 1987
Cabinets disestablished in 1989